Inostemma is a genus of parasitoid wasps belonging to the family Platygastridae.

The genus has cosmopolitan distribution.

Species:
 Inostemma abnormale Tomsík, 1950
 Inostemma abnorme Perkins, 1910

References

Platygastridae
Hymenoptera genera